Hauswald is a German surname. Notable people with the surname include:

Harald Hauswald (born 1954), German photographer
Herbert Hauswald (1912–?), German cyclist
Martin Hauswald (born 1982), German footballer
Simone Hauswald (born 1979), German biathlete

German-language surnames